Ming-Jun Lai is an American mathematician, currently a Professor of Mathematics at the University of Georgia. His area of research is  splines and their numerical analysis. He has published a text on splines called Splines Functions on Triangulations. He was born in Hangzhou, China.

Lai received a B.Sc. from Hangzhou University and a Ph.D. in mathematics from the Texas A&M University in 1989.  His dissertation was entitled "On Construction of Bivariate and Trivariate Vertex Splines on Arbitrary Mixed Grid Partitions" and supervised by Charles K. Chui.

References

 
 
 Ming-Jun Lai at Math Genealogy Project

Year of birth missing (living people)
Living people
Hangzhou University alumni
Texas A&M University alumni
University of Utah alumni
20th-century American mathematicians
21st-century American mathematicians
Chinese emigrants to the United States
University of Georgia faculty